Ruth Kirk may refer to

 Ruth Kirk (1922–2000), wife of New Zealand prime minister Norman Kirk
 Ruth Kirk (author) (1925–2018), author, naturist, and PBS filmographer from Washington State
 Ruth M. Kirk (1930–2011), American politician from Maryland